Regional planning guidance is the predecessor of regional spatial strategies. The RPGs include:
Regional Planning Guidance 1: North East RPG1
Regional Planning Guidance 6: East Anglia to 2016 RPG6
Regional Planning Guidance 8: East Midlands RPG8
Regional Planning Guidance 9: South East RPG9
Regional Transport Strategy (Chapter 9 of RPG for the South East) RPG9 Chapter 9
Chapter 12: Ashford Growth Area RPG Chapter 12
Regional Planning Guidance 10: South West RPG10
Regional Planning Guidance 11: West Midlands RPG11
Regional Planning Guidance 12: Yorkshire and the Humber RPG12
Regional Planning Guidance 13: North West RPG13

Regional planning in England